Cole Reinhardt (born February 1, 2000) is a Canadian professional ice hockey player for the Belleville Senators of the American Hockey League (AHL) as a prospect to the Ottawa Senators of the National Hockey League (NHL).  Reinhardt was drafted by the Senators in the sixth round of the 2020 NHL Entry Draft with the 181st-overall pick.

Playing career
Reinhardt played four seasons of junior with the Brandon Wheat Kings of the Western Hockey League (WHL). He compiled 75 goals and 141 points in 252 games in the WHL. As an overage player, Ottawa drafted him in the sixth round, 181st overall in the 2020 NHL Entry Draft. He made his professional debut with Ottawa's American Hockey League (AHL) affiliate Belleville Senators in 2020, on an amateur tryout. Happy with his play, Ottawa signed him to a three-year entry-level contract in April 2021, commencing with the 2021–22 season. In the 2020-21 season, Reinhardt scored six goals and twelve points in 33 games. Reinhardt returned to Belleville for the 2021–22 season and improved his statistics to 15 goals and 30 points in 70 games. Reinhardt was recalled by Ottawa on April 7, 2022. He played in his first and only NHL game of the season in a 3–2 loss to the Nashville Predators on April 7, 2022. He was returned to Belleville on April 8.

Career statistics

Regular season and playoffs

Source: Hockeydb.com

References

External links

Living people
2000 births
Brandon Wheat Kings players
Ottawa Senators players
Ottawa Senators draft picks
Belleville Senators players
Ice hockey people from Alberta